Dictamnus albus is a species of flowering plant in the family Rutaceae. It is also known as burning bush, dittany, gas plant or fraxinella. This herbaceous perennial has several geographical variants.
It is native to warm, open woodland habitats in southern Europe, north Africa and much of Asia.

Description
Its flowers form a loose pyramidal spike and vary in colour from pale purple to white. The flowers are five-petalled with long projecting stamens. The leaves resemble those of an ash tree.

Cultivation
Several varieties and cultivars have been selected for garden use. The variety D. albus var. purpureus in which the violet-purple is confined to veining of white petals with a slight blush, has gained the Royal Horticultural Society's Award of Garden Merit. Dictamnus is tap-rooted, making mature plants difficult to establish and resistant to division; young plants often need three years before they begin to flower, and since it is late to break into leaf in spring, even quite mature clumps may be harmed with vigorous soil-working in spring. For all these reasons, added to toxicity of the foliage, Dictamnus is rarely seen in American gardens.

Toxicity
The leaves have a bitter and unpalatable taste. Despite the lemon-like smell, the plant is acrid when eaten. All parts of the plant may cause mild stomach upset if eaten, and contact with the foliage may cause phytophotodermatitis.

Volatile oils
The name "burning bush" derives from the volatile oils produced by the plant, which can catch fire readily in hot weather, leading to comparisons with the burning bush of the Bible, including the suggestion that this is the plant involved there. The daughter of Swedish botanist Carl Linnaeus is said to have ignited the air once, at the end of a particularly hot, windless summer day, above Dictamnus plants, using a simple matchstick. The volatile oils have a reputed component of isoprene.

Chemistry
More than 100 chemical constituents have been isolated from the genus Dictamnus, including alkaloids, limonoid triterpenoids, flavonoids, sesquiterpenoids, coumarins, and Phenylpropanoids.

Gallery

References

External links
Growing a Burning Bush, Dictamnus albus, in your Garden
Dictamnus - Gas Plant, Burning Bush, Perennials Guide to Planting Flowers
Video - Burning bush on fire

Medicinal plants of Africa
Medicinal plants of Asia
Medicinal plants of Europe
Flora of Ukraine
Zanthoxyloideae
Taxa named by Carl Linnaeus
Plants described in 1753
Poisonous plants